The 1998 Melbourne Cup was the 138th running of the Melbourne Cup, a prestigious Australian Thoroughbred horse race.

The race was won in 3 mins 18.59s by the New Zealand bred and trained mare Jezabeel (Zabeel-Passefleur) from another kiwi bred and trained mare, Champagne.  Both of them were also by Zabeel and carried 51 kg while the third place-getter, Persian Punch (Ireland) carried 56.5kg.

Field

Fatality
Three Crowns was euthanised after shattering a leg.

References

1998
Melbourne Cup
Melbourne Cup
1990s in Melbourne
November 1998 sports events in Australia